Kick-Ass is a 2010 black comedy superhero film directed by Matthew Vaughn from a screenplay by Jane Goldman and Vaughn. It is based on the comic book of the same name by Mark Millar and John Romita, Jr.

It tells the story of an ordinary teenager, Dave Lizewski (Aaron Johnson), who sets out to become a real-life superhero, calling himself "Kick-Ass". Dave gets caught up in a bigger fight when he meets Big Daddy (Nicolas Cage), a former cop who, in his quest to bring down the crime boss Frank D'Amico (Mark Strong) and his son Red Mist (Christopher Mintz-Plasse), has trained his eleven-year-old daughter (Chloë Grace Moretz) to be the ruthless vigilante Hit-Girl.

The film was released in the United Kingdom on 26 March 2010, by Universal Pictures, and in the United States on 16 April, by Lionsgate. Despite having generated some controversy for its profanity and violence performed by a child, Kick-Ass was well received by both critics and audiences. In 2011 it won the Empire Award for Best British Film. The film has gained a strong cult following since its release on DVD and Blu-ray.

A sequel, written and directed by Jeff Wadlow and produced by Vaughn, was released in August 2013, with Johnson, Mintz-Plasse, and Moretz reprising their roles. In 2018, Vaughn announced his intentions to reboot the series.

Plot
Dave Lizewski is an ordinary teenager who lives in Staten Island, New York. Inspired by comic books, Dave plans to become a real-life superhero. He purchases and modifies a scuba diving suit and arms himself with batons. During his first outing, he gets stabbed and hit by a car. After recovering, he gains a capacity to endure pain and enhanced durability due to having some bones replaced with metal. In his absence from school, a rumor spreads that he is gay. As a result, his longtime crush, Katie Deauxma, immediately attempts to become his friend. Unhappy with the misunderstanding, Dave nevertheless appreciates the opportunity to get closer to Katie.

Dave returns to crime-fighting and gains notoriety after saving a man from a gang attack. Calling himself "Kick-Ass", he sets up a Myspace account where he can be contacted for help. Responding to a request from Katie, he confronts a drug dealer, Rasul, who has been harassing her. At Rasul's place, Kick-Ass is quickly overwhelmed by Rasul's thugs. Before they can kill him, two costumed vigilantes, Hit-Girl and her father, Big Daddy, intervene, easily slaughter the thugs and leave with their money. After coming home, Dave realizes he is in over his head and plans to give up crime-fighting. However, Hit-Girl and Big Daddy pay him a visit and encourage him.

Big Daddy's real identity is Damon Macready, formerly an honest cop. Framed by Mafia boss Frank D'Amico, he was jailed. His wife committed suicide, leaving behind his daughter Mindy. Against the protest of his former partner Marcus Williams, Damon trains himself and Mindy as preparation for getting revenge on Frank. They have been undermining Frank's operations by raiding his warehouses, robbing his money and destroying his drugs. Frank believes Kick-Ass is responsible for the attacks and targets him, though he mistakenly kills a party entertainer who is dressed like Kick-Ass. Frank's son Chris suggests a different approach and poses himself as a new vigilante named "Red Mist" and befriends Kick-Ass.

Chris plans to lure Kick-Ass into Frank's lumber warehouse and unmask him. However, they find the warehouse on fire and Frank's men dead. Red Mist retrieves a hidden camera he earlier placed in the warehouse, and he sees recorded footage of Big Daddy killing the men and burning the warehouse. Red Mist and Kick-Ass part ways. Frank watches the footage and learns of Big Daddy. Following the event, Dave decides to quit being Kick-Ass. He reveals his identity to Katie and clears up the misunderstanding about him being gay. She forgives him and becomes his girlfriend. However, Red Mist contacts him again and tricks him into revealing Big Daddy and Hit-Girl's location.

At one of Big Daddy's safe houses, Red Mist shoots Hit-Girl out of a window, and Frank's men capture Big Daddy and Kick-Ass. Frank intends to have his thugs torture and execute his captives in a live Internet broadcast. While Kick-Ass and Big Daddy are being beaten by Frank's gangsters, Hit-Girl, having survived the shooting, storms the hideout and kills all of the gangsters. During the fight, one thug sets Big Daddy on fire. Big Daddy and Mindy say a tearful farewell before he dies of his burns. Kick-Ass and Hit-Girl resolve to defeat Frank D'Amico once and for all. Hit-Girl infiltrates Frank's headquarters and kills numerous guards and henchmen before running out of bullets.

When Hit-Girl is cornered by the thugs, Kick-Ass arrives on a jet pack fitted with miniguns and kills the remaining thugs. Kick-Ass and Hit-Girl then take on Frank and Red Mist. Kick-Ass fights Red Mist, which results in them knocking each other out. Frank overpowers an exhausted Hit-Girl. Before he can kill her, Kick-Ass regains consciousness and blasts Frank out of the window with a bazooka, killing him. Red Mist then regains consciousness, grabs his father's Samurai sword and pursues Kick-Ass in order to continue their fight just in time to see Kick-Ass and Hit Girl fly away on the jet pack.

Dave and Mindy retire from crime-fighting; Marcus becomes Mindy's guardian, and she enrolls at Dave's school. Meanwhile, Chris sits in his father's office, dressed in an upgraded suit, preparing to seek his revenge on Kick-Ass for killing his father. Facing the camera, he says, "as a great man once said, wait'll they get a load of me", before firing a gun at the screen.

Cast

 Aaron Johnson as Dave Lizewski / Kick-Ass
 Christopher Mintz-Plasse as Chris D’Amico / Red Mist
 Mark Strong as Frank D’Amico
 Chloë Grace Moretz as Mindy Macready / Hit-Girl
 Nicolas Cage as Damon Macready / Big Daddy
 Lyndsy Fonseca as Katie Deauxma
 Clark Duke as Marty Eisenberg
 Evan Peters as Todd Haynes
 Sophie Wu as Erika Cho
 Omari Hardwick as Sergeant Marcus Williams
 Stu Riley as Huge Goon
 Michael Rispoli as Big Joe
 Dexter Fletcher as Cody
 Jason Flemyng as Lobby Goon
 Xander Berkeley as Detective Gigante
 Kofi Natei as Rasul
 Corey Johnson as Sporty Goon
 Adrian Martinez as Ginger Goon
 Katrena Rochell as Female Junkie
 Omar Soriano as Leroy
 Garrett M. Brown as Mr. Lizewski
 Elizabeth McGovern as Mrs. Lizewski
 Yancy Butler as Angie D'Amico
 Deborah Twiss as Mrs. Zane
 Craig Ferguson as himself 

Series-creator Millar, a native of Scotland, asked Scottish television children's-show host Glen Michael to make a cameo appearance although his role was cut from the film. Millar was also set to make a cameo as a Scottish alcoholic but the scene was cut from the film. WCBS-TV news reporters Maurice DuBois, Dana Tyler, and Lou Young make cameo appearances along with Marvel Comics creator Stan Lee.

An image of Matthew Vaughn's wife, model Claudia Schiffer, appears prominently on a billboard poster. John Romita Jr. appears without his face being shown: "I was a barista. ... [T]hey asked me to look at the camera, then turn and turn the television on with a remote control. And then they edited out my face! I laughed and laughed — I was the only authentic New Yorker in the scene and they edited out my face for not looking authentic enough! Then the producer, Tarquin Pack ... changed my first name to Tony: Tony Romita. 'Why'd you do that?' I asked. 'Well, "Johnny Romita" wasn't tough enough.'"

Production

Development

The rights to a film version of the first volume of the comic book series were sold before the first issue was published. Developed in parallel, the film writers took a different story direction, to reach many of the same conclusions. Comic book writer Mark Millar acknowledges the differences, explaining that a comic usually has eight acts, while a film usually has a three-act structure. Millar initially considered having American Jesus adapted and communicated to Vaughn about that concept, but Vaughn switched to Kick Ass after Millar mentioned it and sent some materials to Vaughn.

Vaughn said that, "We wrote the script and the comic at the same time so it was a very sort of collaborative, organic process. I met [Millar] at the premiere of Stardust. We got on really well. I knew who he was and what he had done but I didn't know him. He pitched me the idea. I said, 'That's great!' He then wrote a synopsis. I went, 'That's great, let's go do it now! You write the comic, I'll write the script. Jane Goldman, one of the screenwriters, said that when she works with Vaughn she does the "construction work" and the "interior designing" while Vaughn acts as the "architect."

Millar said that screenwriters Goldman and Vaughn had made a "chick flick", having placed more emphasis on the character emotions and particularly in having softened the character of Katie Deauxma. Millar stated that a film audience would have difficulty accepting Dave and Katie not being together, while a comic audience would more easily accept that idea. Frank Lovece of Film Journal International said that Katie is "much less Mean Girls" in the film than in the comic, and that the romance between Dave and Katie "proves a needed counterbalance to the otherwise pervasive sense of optimism being stripped away layer by layer, down below angry cynicism and headed straight down the hole to nihilism." Kenneth Turan of the Los Angeles Times said "the romance provides an appealing backdrop that the more unnerving aspects of the film play out against." Other changes included having Red Mist be known to be a secret antagonist from the start, as well as making him less outright villainous, and D'Amico's mob initially thinking Kick-Ass is the one slaughtering their men.

In the original comic-book, Big Daddy is characterised not as an ex-cop, but as a former accountant who had been motivated to fight crime by a desire to escape from his life and by his love of comic books. In the film, his purported origin and motivations are genuine: writer Mark Millar stated that the revelation about Big Daddy's background would not have worked in the film adaptation and "would have ruined the movie."

The comic's artist, John Romita, Jr., stated that Big Daddy's story in the film "works better stopping short ... You love him better in the film".

The climax to the film differs significantly from the comics, with the use of the jetpack and rocket launcher: Millar called this "necessary" as "we're building up so much stuff that we needed some Luke Skywalker blowing up the Death Star moment". Comic writer Stephen Grant argued that the film "cheated" on its premise of a "real life" superhero by having these increasingly fantastic events and that this was "why it works. That's where much of the humor comes from ... when the film finally makes the notion [the fantasy] explicit we're already so deep into the magician's act that our instinct is to play along".

Vaughn initially went to Sony, which distributed Layer Cake, but he rejected calls to tone down the violence. Other studios expressed interest but wanted to make the characters older. In particular studios wanted to change Hit-Girl's character into an adult. Goldman said that while studio executives said that it would be less offensive to portray Hit-Girl as a teenager, Goldman argued that it would have been more offensive since, as a teenager, Hit-Girl would have been sexualized. Goldman said that Hit-Girl was not supposed to be sexualized.

Vaughn had a little trouble adapting to film, as the film had no studio. The big studios doubted the success of an adaptation as a violent superhero, which made the film be independently financed, but this gave him the freedom to make the film the way he imagined, without having to worry about high-censorship. Vaughn believed enough in the project to raise the money himself. Christopher Mintz-Plasse (Red Mist) said that the creators of the film were wondering whether a distributor would pick up the movie. On the set Vaughn jokingly referred to Kick-Ass as something that was going to be "the most expensive home movie I ever made". On 18 August 2009, it was announced that the film had been acquired for distribution in the United States and Canada by Lionsgate.

The 2D/3D animated comic book sequence in the film took almost two years to finish. Romita created the pencils, Tom Palmer did the inks, and Dean White did the colours. Vaughn gave Romita a carte blanche on the art direction of the sequence.

Filming

Filming locations included Hamilton, Ontario, Canada; Dip 'N' Sip Donuts on Kingston Road in Toronto, Sir Winston Churchill Secondary School, and "many Toronto landmarks that play cameos"; and various locations in the United Kingdom, including Elstree Studios.
The opening sequence with Nicolas Cage was filmed in a sewage plant in east London.

The Atomic Comics store in the film is based on the now-defunct real-life Arizona-based chain whose owner, Millar said, is a friend of artist John Romita Jr.
Millar asked Mike Malve for permission to use Atomic Comics in the film, and a model version of Atomic Comics was created at the London pilot studio for use in the filming.

Controversy
In January 2010, an uncensored preview clip of the film was attacked by family advocacy groups for its display of violence and use of the line "Okay, you cunts, let's see what you can do now," delivered by Chloë Grace Moretz, who was 12 years old at the time of filming. Australian Family Association spokesman John Morrissey said that "the language [was] offensive and the values inappropriate; without the saving grace of the bloodless victory of traditional superheroes".

Moretz stated in an interview, "If I ever uttered one word that I said in Kick-Ass, I would be grounded for years! I'd be stuck in my room until I was 20! I would never in a million years say that. I'm an average, everyday girl."
Moretz has said that while filming, she could not bring herself to say the film's title out loud in interviews, instead calling it "the film" in public and "Kick-Butt" at home.

Christopher Mintz-Plasse notes a hypocrisy that people were angry about the language but did not seem to be offended that Hit-Girl kills numerous people.

Ratings

In an interview with Total Film, Aaron Johnson confirmed that the film stays true to the adult nature of the comic series by featuring a large amount of profanity and graphic violence. The film received an R rating by the MPAA for "strong brutal violence throughout, pervasive language, sexual content, nudity and some drug use—some involving children", and it received a 15 rating from the BBFC.
Director Matthew Vaughn felt the 15 certificate was about right and expressed some surprise at the film having received a "PG rating " in France.

Reception

Box office
The film earned over $12 million internationally in advance of opening in the United States. On its debut weekend in the United States it took in $19.8 million in 3,065 theaters, averaging $6,469 per theater. Kick-Ass was reported number one, ahead of How to Train Your Dragon by $200,000, which was in its third week of release. On Saturday, 17 April 2010, it fell down to number three behind How To Train Your Dragon and Date Night. On Sunday, 2 May 2010, it fell down behind A Nightmare on Elm Street, How To Train Your Dragon, Furry Vengeance, The Back-Up Plan, Date Night, Clash of the Titans and The Losers. These numbers for Kick-Asss debut weekend gross included non-weekend earnings, as the film was previewed during the Thursday night prior to its release. The film's final gross in the U.S. was $48,071,303 and $48,117,600 outside of the U.S. with a worldwide gross of $96,188,903.

The film was listed among the most infringed films of 2010; according to statistics on TorrentFreak, the film was illegally downloaded over 11.4 million times, second only to Avatar.

Critical response

The site's critics consensus reads: "Not for the faint of heart, Kick-Ass takes the comic adaptation genre to new levels of visual style, bloody violence, and gleeful profanity." Metacritic assigned the film a weighted average score of 66 out of 100, based on 38 mainstream critics, indicating "generally favorable reviews". American audiences polled by CinemaScore gave the film an average grade of "B" on an A+ to F scale.

In the United Kingdom, The Guardian gave the film extensive coverage by several of its critics and journalists. Peter Bradshaw gave the film 5/5 stars and called it an "explosion in a bad taste factory" that is "thoroughly outrageous, jaw-droppingly violent and very funny riff on the quasi-porn world of comic books; except that there is absolutely no 'quasi' about it." Philip French, writing for The Observer, called the film "relentlessly violent" with "the foulest-mouthed child ever to appear on screen, [who makes] Louis Malle's Zazie sound like Cosette" and one "extremely knowing in its appeal to connoisseurs of comic strips and video games." David Cox wrote an article published in The Guardian, saying that the film "kicks the c-word into the mainstream [...] has inadvertently dispatched our last big expletive."

Chris Hewitt of Empire magazine gave the film 5/5 and declared it, "A ridiculously entertaining, perfectly paced, ultra-violent cinematic rush that kicks the places other movies struggle to reach. ... the film's violence is clearly fantastical and cartoonish and not to be taken seriously."

Critics who enjoyed the film generally singled out its audacity, humour, and performances of the cast. Peter Howell of the Toronto Star gave Kick-Ass a top rating, writing that the production "succeeds as a violent fantasy about our perilous and fretful times, where regular citizens feel compelled to take action against a social order rotting from within."
USA Today critic Claudia Puig praised Moretz as "terrific ... Even as she wields outlandish weaponry, she comes off as adorable." Manohla Dargis from The New York Times wrote, "Fast, periodically spit-funny and often grotesquely violent, the film at once embraces and satirizes contemporary action-film clichés with Tarantino-esque self-regard." Owen Gleiberman of Entertainment Weekly gave the film a B+, but noted that "personally, I just wish that the film had ended up a bit less of an over-the-top action ride."

Other reviews were more negative. Roger Ebert found the film highly offensive and "morally reprehensible", giving it one out of four stars. He cited the coarse language and violence, particularly the scene in which Hit-Girl is nearly killed by D'Amico. "When kids in the age range of this movie's home video audience are shooting one another every day in America, that kind of stops being funny." Ebert's only notes of praise were for the performances of Cage, Johnson and Moretz. The movie made that week's "Your Movie Sucks" list of one-star movies.

Tim Robey of The Daily Telegraph did not like the film either, rating it 1/5 and stating, "Matthew Vaughn's Kick Ass is hollow, glazed, and not quite there".

Karina Longworth writing for The Village Voice, was not impressed with the film's intended satire and themes: "Never as shocking as it thinks it is, as funny as it should be, or as engaged in cultural critique as it could be, Kick-Ass is half-assed."

Accolades

Release

Home media

In an interview, Matthew Vaughn said, "There is about 18 minutes of [deleted] footage, which is really good stuff. If the film is a hit, I'll do an extended cut."
The film was released on DVD and Blu-ray on 3 August 2010 in North America.
This version does not contain the aforementioned deleted content.
Selling 1.4 million units within its first week, one-third of these in Blu-ray format, Kick-Ass debuted at number one on the DVD sales chart. The discs were released in the United Kingdom on 6 September 2010.

After its release on home video, it developed a cult following.

Video game

A video game based on the film was developed by Frozen Codebase. It was released through the App Store on 15 April 2010 for the iPhone and iPod Touch.
The initial Apple platform release was reportedly an unfinished beta version and was withdrawn from circulation pending a relaunch of a finished version. The game was released on the PlayStation Network on 29 April 2010. Kick-Ass, Hit-Girl and Big Daddy are playable characters. The game features Facebook missions and integration. Both versions of the game received negative reviews.

Sequel

Despite various setbacks and uncertainty as to whether the sequel would ever materialize, on 8 May 2012, it was reported that a sequel would be distributed by Universal Studios, and that Matthew Vaughn had chosen Jeff Wadlow, who also wrote the script, to direct the sequel. Aaron Johnson and Chloë Grace Moretz reprise their roles as Kick-Ass and Hit-Girl, respectively, and Christopher Mintz-Plasse returns as the main villain, going by the name of "The Motherfucker". The film was released on 14 August 2013 in the United Kingdom and on 16 August 2013 in the United States.

See also
 Kick-Ass: Music from the Motion Picture
 Vigilante film

Notes

References

External links

 
 
 
 
 
 
 

2010 films
2010 action comedy films
2010 black comedy films
2010s high school films
2010s superhero comedy films
2010s teen comedy films
American action comedy films
American black comedy films
American high school films
American superhero films
American teen comedy films
British action comedy films
British black comedy films
British high school films
British teen comedy films
2010s English-language films
Films based on Marvel Comics
Films based on works by Mark Millar
Films directed by Matthew Vaughn
Films produced by Brad Pitt
Films scored by Marius de Vries
Films scored by Ilan Eshkeri
Films scored by Henry Jackman
Films scored by John Murphy (composer)
British films set in New York City
Films shot at Elstree Film Studios
Films shot at Pinewood Studios
Films shot in Hamilton, Ontario
Films shot in London
Films shot in Toronto
Kick-Ass (franchise)
Lionsgate films
Live-action films based on Marvel Comics
Mafia films
Plan B Entertainment films
Films with screenplays by Jane Goldman
Films with screenplays by Matthew Vaughn
Superhero black comedy films
Teen superhero comedy films
Universal Pictures films
American vigilante films
Films produced by Matthew Vaughn
Cultural depictions of the Mafia
Teen action films
Films about father–daughter relationships
Film controversies
Film controversies in the United States
Casting controversies in film
Obscenity controversies in film
Rating controversies in film
2010s American films
Films shot in Hertfordshire
2010s British films